Maigret and the Hotel Majestic is a 1942 detective novel by the Belgian writer Georges Simenon featuring his character Jules Maigret.

This novel was first published in English in 1977 by Hamish Hamilton (London) and Harcourt Brace Jovanovich (New York), translated by Caroline Hillier, later also published under the title The Hotel Majestic.

In 2015, this novel was reissued in English under the title The Cellars of the Majestic, newly translated by Howard Curtis.

Synopsis
Maigret is called to the high-class Hotel Majestic to investigate a body. The wife of a wealthy American has been killed - but to Maigret's surprise she has a gun in her purse. He begins to follow up the handful of clues that could explain her secret life and her demise.

Adaptations
It has been adapted on two occasions for television. In 1993 it was made into an episode of an ITV Maigret series.

It was filmed in 1945 as Majestic Hotel Cellars.

References

1942 Belgian novels
Maigret novels
Novels set in hotels
Belgian novels adapted into films